Chronologies of Provisional Irish Republican Army actions detail activities by the Provisional Irish Republican Army, an Irish republican paramilitary organisation that sought to end British rule in Northern Ireland and bring about an independent republic encompassing all of Ireland.
The chronologies are mostly organized by decade.

Chronologies

Chronology of Provisional Irish Republican Army actions (1970–1979)
Chronology of Provisional Irish Republican Army actions (1980–1989)
Chronology of Provisional Irish Republican Army actions (1990–1991)
Chronology of Provisional Irish Republican Army actions (1992–1999)
Chronology of Provisional Irish Republican Army actions in the 21st century

See also
Timeline of Continuity Irish Republican Army actions
Timeline of Real Irish Republican Army actions
Timeline of Irish National Liberation Army actions
Timeline of Official Irish Republican Army actions
Timeline of Ulster Volunteer Force actions
Timeline of Ulster Defence Association actions
Timeline of the Northern Ireland Troubles
List of attacks on British aircraft during The Troubles

Provisional Irish Republican Army actions
Terrorist incidents by perpetrator
The Troubles (Northern Ireland)
The Troubles (Northern Ireland)-related lists